Back To Da Barrio is a salsa album by Michael Stuart which covers popular reggaeton songs in salsa. The album was nominated for Tropical Album of the Year by a Male Artist at the 2007 Latin Billboard Music Awards, losing to Víctor Manuelle's Decisión Unánime.

Track listing 
 Mayor Que Yo [4:21]
 Pobre Diabla [4:04]
 No Soy Tu Marido [4:12]
 Paga Lo Que Debes [4:39]
 Ella y Yo (featuring Tito Rojas) [4:06]
 Vengo Guapeando [4:31]
 Ya Lo Se [4:53]
 Soy Callejero [4:13]
 Ven Bailalo [4:16]
 Nadie Sabe [4:59]
 Noche de Travesura [4:01]
 Loco [4:43]

Chart position

References 

2006 albums
Michael Stuart albums